Gotha (also known as Gota) is a settlement in east-central Ethiopia. Located in the Shinile Zone of the Somali Region. Gotha is served by a station on the Addis Ababa - Djibouti Railway.

Demographics
As of 2005, the population of Lasarat has been estimated to be 869. The city inhabitants belong to various mainly Afro-Asiatic-speaking ethnic groups, with the Issa Somali predominant.

Populated places in the Somali Region